Dielman may refer to:

Frederick Dielman (1847–1935), American portrait and figure painter
Kris Dielman (born 1981), American former football guard for the San Diego Chargers
Jeanne Dielman, 23 quai du Commerce, 1080 Bruxelles, a 1975 film by Belgian filmmaker Chantal Akerman

See also
Dalman
Dielmann, a surname
Dillman (disambiguation)
Dilman
Dolman
Tielman (disambiguation)